Anthocoridae is a family of bugs, commonly called minute pirate bugs or flower bugs. Worldwide there are 500-600 species.

Description
Anthocoridae are 1.5–5 mm long and have soft, elongated oval, flat bodies, often patterned in black and white. The head is extended forward and the antennae are longer than the head and visible from above. They possess a piercing and sucking three-segmented beak or labium used to inject prey with digestive enzymes and consume food. In general appearance, they resemble soft bugs Miridae, but Anthocoridae differ by their possession of two ocelli as adults. Anthocorids possess two pairs of wings with hemelytra and membranous hindwings.

Many species are referred to as insidious flower bugs or pirate bugs. The scientific name is a combination of the Greek words anthos "flower" and koris "bug".

Habitat and behaviour
Many species can be found in cryptic habitats such as galls, but can also be present in open surface environments. They can often be found in many agricultural crops. They can feed on plant material, but mostly feed on other small soft-bodied arthropods. Anthocorids are often predacious both as nymphs and adults. They are beneficial as biological control agents. Orius insidiosus, the "insidious flower bug", for example, feeds on the eggs of the corn earworm (Helicoverpa zea). Orius insidiosus is often released in greenhouses against mites and thrips.

Eggs are laid in plant material and hatch in approximately 3 to 5 days. Nymphs require at least 20 days to progress through five instars. Adults live for approximately 35 days.
These small insects can bite humans, however, they do not feed on human blood or inject venom or saliva. Reactions to bites in individuals can range from no effect to minor swelling and irritation.

Systematics
There are two subfamilies and at least 8 tribes:

Anthocorinae
Auth. Fieber, 1837
tribe Almeidini Carayon, 1972
 Almeida (bug) Distant, 1910
 Australmeida Woodward, 1977
 Lippomanus Distant, 1904
tribe Anthocorini Fieber, 1837
Selected genera:
 Acompocoris Reuter, 1875 i c g b
 Anthocoris Fallen, 1814 i c g b
 Coccivora McAtee & Malloch, 1925 i c g b
 Dufouriellus Kirkaldy, 1906
 Elatophilus Reuter, 1884 i c g b
 Melanocoris Champion, 1900 i c g b
 Temnostethus Fieber, 1860 i c g b
 Tetraphleps Fieber, 1860 i c g b
tribe Blaptopstethini Carayon, 1972
 Blaptostethoides Carayon, 1972
 Blaptostethus Fieber, 1860
tribe Cardiastethini Carayon, 1972
Selected genera:
 Amphiareus Distant, 1904
 Brachysteles Mulsant & Rey, 1852
 Buchananiella Reuter, 1884
 Cardiastethus Fieber, 1860
tribe Oriini Carayon, 1955
Selected genera:
 Orius Wolff, 1811 i c g b
tribe Scolopini Carayon, 1954
Selected genera:
 Calliodis Reuter, 1871
 Scoloposcelis Fieber, 1864
tribe Xylocorini Carayon, 1972 (monotypic)
 Xylocoris Dufour, 1831
incertae sedis
 Crytosternum Fieber, 1860

Lasiochilinae
Auth. Carayon, 1972 (sometimes placed at family level: "Lasiochilidae")
 tribe Lasiochilini Carayon, 1972
 Lasiochilus Reuter, 1871
 Plochiocoris Champion, 1900
 genera incertae sedis

Unplaced genera
 Lilia (bug) White, 1879
 Opisthypselus Reuter, 1908
 4 fossil genera

Data sources: i = ITIS, c = Catalogue of Life, g = GBIF, b = Bugguide.net

References

External links

Pirate bugs
Pirate bugs (with pictures)

 
Heteroptera families